Pomacentrus alleni, the Andaman damsel, is a Damselfish from the Eastern Indian Ocean. It occasionally makes its way into the aquarium trade. It grows to a size of 6 cm in length. The specific name honours the ichthyologist Gerald R. Allen of the Western Australia Museum in Perth.

In aquarium
It's not afraid of equally aggressive fish. In a small tank, if there are not many fishes, you may consider to keep a small Pomacentrus alleni. But be aware that it is quite hostile to clownfish.

References

External links
 Allen's Damsel @ Fishes of Australia

alleni
Fauna of Christmas Island
Fish of the Indian Ocean
Fish described in 1981